Chun Shui Tang is an international teahouse chain based in Taichung, Taiwan. The restaurants specializes in serving bubble tea, but also serve other entrees and snacks. Founded in 1983 as Yanghsien Tea Shop, Chun Shui Tang is one of two Taiwanese restaurant chains that claim to have invented bubble milk tea, the other being Hanlin Tea Room.

Aside from restaurants, Chun Shui Tang also owns TP Tea, another chain of take-out stores that only sell bubble tea.

History 
Chun Shui Tang was founded as Yangmu Tea Shop (陽羨茶館) on May 20, 1983 by Han-chieh Liu (劉漢介) on Siwei Street in Taichung. Fascinated by formalities of Chinese tea culture, Liu was very insistent on his decor and placed old paintings and burnt incense in his shop. In the summer months, hot tea doesn't sell as well, so Liu began experimenting with cold tea drinks using a cocktail shaker, which sold unexpectedly well. He was inspired to serve cold tea by a trip to Japan on which he saw coffee being served cold. The chain claims to have invented bubble milk tea in March 1987 when Hsiuhwei Lin (林秀慧) poured tapioca into a tea drink on a whim.

In 2013, Chun Shui Tang established their first store outside Taiwan in Daikanyama, an upscale shopping district in Tokyo, Japan. Since then, more stores have opened in Japan, causing a boom in bubble tea's popularity in Japan. In 2018, Chun Shui Tang opened another store in Hong Kong's West Kowloon railway station. Till late 2020, Chun Shui Tang has already opened 8 branches in Hong Kong, including Causeway Bay and Mong Kok.

Menu 

Chun Shui Tang specializes in bubble tea, but they also serve a wide variety of Taiwanese food, including gaifan dishes, beef noodle soup, lu wei, dougan, pig's blood cake, mochi, and more. It takes six months for a bar worker to learn to make the 80 or so drinks on the menu. Chun Shui Tang offers different seasonal products by time to time, e.g. Uji Matcha series, Herbal Jelly series etc.

References

External links
 

Companies based in Taichung
Restaurants established in 1983
Taiwanese companies established in 1983
Restaurant chains in Taiwan
Tea companies of Taiwan
Bubble tea brands